Yershovo is a rural locality (a village) in Teplogorskoye Rural Settlement, Velikoustyugsky District, Vologda Oblast, Russia. The population was 57 as of 2002.

Geography 
Yershovo is located 75 km southeast of Veliky Ustyug (the district's administrative centre) by road. Pestovo is the nearest rural locality.

References 

Rural localities in Velikoustyugsky District